Marian Petre Miluţ (born 29 December 1955, Craiova, Dolj County, Romania) is a Romanian politician, engineer and businessman. He was president of the Romanian Small and Medium Entrepreneurs Union, assisting the Union's co-operation with the European People's Party (EPP), and president of the Christian Democratic National Peasants' Party (PNȚ-CD). He has promoted and helped modernise Romanian small and medium enterprise, and has organized a series of debates on the modernising of Romanian infrastructure.He provided financial support for building the Stadionul Prefab.

Honours
  Romanian Royal Family: 41st Knight of the Royal Decoration of the Cross of the Romanian Royal House

Presidential elections

References

Candidates for President of Romania
People from Craiova
Living people
1955 births
Christian Democratic National Peasants' Party politicians